Modern Times School, also known as District 12 School and Brentwood School, is a historic school building located at Brentwood in Suffolk County, New York.

History 
The school building was built in 1857 by the utopian community of Modern Times  and was originally a small, one story, frame octagonal building sheathed in board and batten siding and surmounted by a hipped roof with octagonal cupola. It featured a rectangular projecting entrance portico surmounted by a gable roof. It has been moved twice, altered, and suffered significant deterioration. It was converted for residential use in 1907 to make room for a larger schoolhouse and was moved to its present site in 1989.

The building is one of the few surviving structures of the village of Modern Times, which was founded by reformers Josiah Warren and Stephen Pearl Andrews as an experimental community in the nineteenth century. The village based itself on individual freedom and was known for its lack of jail, police, judge or money. The village lasted 13 years before renaming itself "Brentwood" to rid itself of bad connotations.

It was added to the National Register of Historic Places in 1994. In 2016, the Brentwood Historical Society funded its renovation and preservation.

References

External links

Long Island Ruins - Around Brentwood Today

School buildings on the National Register of Historic Places in New York (state)
School buildings completed in 1857
Octagonal school buildings in the United States
Buildings and structures in Suffolk County, New York
National Register of Historic Places in Suffolk County, New York
1857 establishments in New York (state)